Werner Zahn (November 15, 1890 in Wiesloch, Germany – 1971 in Wolfenbüttel, West Germany) was a German bobsledder who competed in the 1930s. He won the gold medal in the four-man event at the 1931 FIBT World Championships in St. Moritz. He was also a veteran of World War I.

References
Bobsleigh four-man world championship medalists since 1930
Back in Time: In 1932, Roosevelt welcomed Winter Games to Lake Placid

1890 births
1971 deaths
German male bobsledders
German military personnel of World War I
People from Wiesloch
Sportspeople from Karlsruhe (region)